Aconodes costatus is a species of beetle in the family Cerambycidae. It was described by Félix Édouard Guérin-Méneville in 1843. It is known from India.

References

Aconodes
Beetles described in 1843